The Anti-Œdipus Papers is a collection of journal entries and notes written between 1969 and 1973 by the French philosopher and psychotherapist Félix Guattari. These notes, addressed to Gilles Deleuze by Guattari in preparation for their then-upcoming work, Anti-Oedipus. 

The papers reveal Guattari as an inventive, highly analytical, mathematically-minded “conceptor,” arguably one of the most prolific and enigmatic figures in philosophy and sociopolitical theory today. As a whole, the papers serve to expand upon, and propose their own, psychoanalytic theory, they are supplemented by journal entries explaining the relationships between Guattari and many of his companions including Deleuze, Jacques Lacan, and Jean Oury.

References

2006 non-fiction books
Works by Félix Guattari
Semiotext(e) books